Julie Johnson is a 2001 independent American drama film directed by Bob Gosse and starring Lili Taylor, Courtney Love, and Mischa Barton. Written by Gosse and Wendy Hammond, the plot focuses on a New Jersey housewife (Taylor) who, after separating from her husband, falls in love with her wayward friend (Love) and begins a relationship with her. The film features an original score by Angelo Badalamenti as well as a soundtrack by Liz Phair.

Julie Johnson debuted at the Sundance Film Festival and was shown at several film festivals worldwide between 2001 and 2004, later appearing on the here TV network as part of their films series. Courtney Love won the award for Outstanding Actress in a Feature Film for her performance from Los Angeles' Outfest in 2001.

Plot
Julie Johnson is a bored New Jersey housewife who is unhappy with her life and decides to take a computer class at a local college.  When her husband finds out and is unsupportive and verbally abusive, she decides that enough is enough and the couple separate.  Inspired, her friend Claire leaves her husband, and, having nowhere to go, moves in with Julie and her son and daughter.  Living together, Julie and Claire develop a relationship that is more than just a friendship.  Problems arise when Julie, immersed in studies, makes new, scholarly, cultured friends and Claire doesn't mesh well with them.

Cast

Production
Filming of Julie Johnson took place in June 2000 in New Jersey and New York City, with some filming occurring in Fort Greene, Brooklyn.

Taylor was cast in the title role, and felt that her character was "basically asleep, and then the tension builds and she breaks. This story reminds me of the fairy tale called The Handless Maiden, and for a while I imagined her without hands, as someone incomplete." Love was inspired to take the role  of Claire after becoming acquainted with several LGBT people who were not out: "I grew up on the West Coast with hippies, where if people were gay, they were gay," Love recalled in 2000. "No big deal. But then a couple of years ago, when I started getting projected more into the mainstream and having to deal with mainstream American values and not really understanding it, I started to meet people who weren't out, who weren't resolved with it, and that's the majority of people who live in this country. And I started to have a lot more compassion for the fact that they can't come out, because it's not that easy."

Release
Julie Johnson premiered at the Sundance Film Festival on January 26, 2001.

Critical response
Andy Bailey of IndieWire deemed the film "well-intentioned but disastrously executed" despite praising the central performances. Dennis Harvey of Variety praised the performances of Taylor and Love, but ultimately deemed the film a "limp inspirational drama that lifts its premise whole from Good Will Hunting, then filters that through telepic-ish housewife-empowerment cliches." Time Out wrote: "There are some sweet, simmering moments between the two women as both Taylor and Love breathe life into an unlikely script. And despite the downbeat ending that sees maths and star formations triumph over lesbian happiness, it's a warm if oddly dated tale of female emancipation won against the odds."

References

External links
 

2001 films
2001 drama films
2001 independent films
2001 LGBT-related films
American drama films
American independent films
American LGBT-related films
Films directed by Bob Gosse
Films scored by Angelo Badalamenti
Films set in New Jersey
Films shot in New York City
Films shot in New Jersey
Lesbian-related films
LGBT-related drama films
2000s English-language films
2000s American films